The Adidas Beau Jeu is one of the official match balls of the UEFA Euro 2016 tournament. It was used for the group stage of the tournament, after which it was replaced by the "Adidas Fracas" (a design variant of the Beau Jeu) for the knockout stage. The French phrase "Beau Jeu" translates to "Beautiful Game" or "Beautiful Play".

Overview
Unveiled by Adidas and presented by former French national player Zinedine Zidane on 12 November 2015, the ball features elements of the Adidas Brazuca, but in a new design. The design includes blue lines with orange detail with letters and numbers on each line creating "EURO" and "2016".

In the group match between Switzerland and France on 19 June, the ball burst during a challenge between Antoine Griezmann and Valon Behrami.

The "Errejota" – official ball of the 2016 Summer Olympics and Paralympics – was based on the Beau Jeu but with a surface design change.

References

Beau Jeu
UEFA Euro 2016
UEFA European Championship balls